The  is an Anti-tank/Landing craft missile used by the JGSDF. It is the first Japanese missile system that uses a complete digitally controlled interface.

History 
Development of the Type 96 system began in 1986 by JGSDF Ground Research and Development Command.

Description 
The Type 96 missile has a large warhead which can destroy tanks with a direct hit from the top, but it can also be used in an anti-helicopter role. The missile is guided by an operator with an infrared image monitor in the launch vehicle. An optical fiber connects the flying missile's infrared camera and its guidance system. It can also be fired vertically and the fibre-optic cable is paid out from the back of the missile as it flies.

The warhead is unnecessarily large for attacking tanks because it is also designed to destroy landing craft (LCAC). Japanese officers estimate that no tank can survive a direct hit to the weak point of its top armor by the Type 96 Multi-Purpose Missile System. This is a result of the missile striking the tank from the top, which is not so heavily armoured as the front and side sections of the tank.

It is designed to destroy remote targets before a landing, such as armoured fighting vehicles or small landing ships. The gunner carries out target selection and acquisition and the automatic tracker locks onto the image of the target. Tracking commands are relayed to the ground station computer, which sends steering command data up the fibre-optic cable to guide the missile. The gunner can also carry out manual tracking.

Operators
: 37 Sets (2012)

Similar missiles 
ALAS
CM-501G
FOG-MPM
MGM-157 EFOGM
XM501 Non-Line-of-Sight Launch System
Polyphem, a similar European project

See also
 ALAS (missile)
Middle range MPM
 Type 64 MAT
 Type 79 Jyu-MAT
 Type 01 LMAT

Notes

References

External links
 Official JGSDF Page (in Japanese)
 EFOGM Project Details on Army Technology
 Guided Missile Specifications Japan Ministry of Defence
 Type-96 Multi-Purpose Missile System GlobalSecurity.org
 Type-96 Multi-Purpose Missile System fas.org

Post–Cold War anti-tank missiles of Japan
Anti-tank guided missiles of Japan
Post–Cold War military equipment of Japan
Post–Cold War weapons of Japan
Japan Ground Self-Defense Force
Military equipment introduced in the 1990s